Pamela Marie Tremont is an American diplomat who is the nominee to be the United States ambassador to Zimbabwe.

Early life and education
Tremont earned a Bachelor of Arts and Master of Arts from Baylor University and a master's degree from the Dwight D. Eisenhower School at the National Defense University.

Career
Tremont is a career member of the Senior Foreign Service, with the rank of Minister-Counselor. She currently serves as Deputy Chief of Mission at the U.S. Embassy in Stockholm, Sweden previously serving as its Chargé d'Affaires for 18 months. Previously, Tremont worked in the U.S. Embassy in Kyiv, Ukraine as well as the U.S. Embassy in Nicosia, Cyprus. Other assignments include deputy director for NATO Policy in the Bureau of European and Eurasian Affairs at the State Department, the Political/Economic Counselor at the U.S. Embassy in Lusaka, Zambia, and a Political Military Officer in the U.S. Embassy in London, United Kingdom. Tremont also served as Political Military Officer at the U.S. Embassy in Ankara, Turkey, as a Desk Officer for South Africa in the Bureau of African Affairs, and as a Watch Officer in the State Department's Operations Center.

Ambassador to Zimbabwe
On June 22, 2022, President Joe Biden nominated Tremont to be the next ambassador to Zimbabwe. Her nomination was returned to President Biden on January 3, 2023 as no action was taken on it for the rest of the year.

President Biden renominated Tremont the same day. Her nomination is pending before the Senate Foreign Relations Committee.

Personal life
Tremont speaks French and Turkish.

References

Living people
Baylor University alumni
National Defense University alumni
United States Foreign Service personnel
Year of birth missing (living people)
American diplomats
American women diplomats